Palayee Agraharam is a village in the Pattukkottai taluk of Thanjavur district, Tamil Nadu, India.

Demographics 

As per the 2001 census, Palayee Agraharam had a total population of 580 with 285 males and 295 females. The sex ratio was 1035. The literacy rate was 76.42.

References 

 

Villages in Thanjavur district